Göhlen is a municipality in the Ludwigslust-Parchim district, in Mecklenburg-Vorpommern, Germany. The former municipality Leussow was merged into Göhlen in May 2019.

Notable people
Siegfried Wustrow (born 1936), retired cyclist

References

Ludwigslust-Parchim